HD 126009 or CI Boötis is a variable star in the northern constellation of Boötes.

References

External links
 HIC 70236
 Image HD 126009

Boötes
126009
070236
Boötis, CI
M-type giants
Slow irregular variables
Durchmusterung objects